Seawright is a surname. Notable people with the surname include:

 George Seawright ( 1951–1987), Unionist politician in Northern Ireland
 James Seawright (born 1936), modernist American sculptor
 Jonas Seawright (born 1982), American football player
 Paul Seawright (born 1965), Irish artist
 Roy Seawright (1905−1991), American special effects artist
 Toni Seawright (born 1964), American actress and singer-songwriter